René Dif (born 17 October 1967) is a Danish musician, singer-songwriter, DJ and actor, best known as the male lead vocalist of the Danish-Norwegian eurodance group Aqua.

Biography

1967–1994: Early years and private life
Dif was born in Copenhagen. His father was Algerian and his mother Danish. He has two younger brothers and a sister. He was never interested in school and was kicked out of it several times. As a result, Dif left school after ninth grade to work on a cruise ship.

1994–1995: Groove your soul
While he was in Barbados, Dif heard a local DJ on the radio and decided to become a DJ. He went to Norway to pursue his dream of becoming a star. Dif met Lene Nystrøm on a cruise ship in 1994. When he, Claus Norreen, and Søren Rasted were setting up a band, they needed a singer, and Lene was asked to join. The band, which was later known as Aqua, became an international success. While a DJ in Norway, Dif met DJ Alligator, with whom he made an album, Groove your soul, and the debut single "I believe". Although unsuccessful, they marked the debut of Dif as an aspiring DJ with vocal abilities.

1996–2001: Aqua

Dif, as a member of Aqua, has had over ten top 10 hits in his home country. The band sold more than 28 million records worldwide and appeared in the Guinness Book of Records as the only debut band with three "self-penned" number one hits in the UK. He has received more than 140 Gold and Platinum albums, and a Diamond album (1 million albums sold) in Canada. Aqua's main hits were "Roses Are Red", "My Oh My", "Barbie Girl", "Lollipop (Candyman)", "Doctor Jones", "Turn Back Time", "Good Morning Sunshine", "Cartoon Heroes" and "Around the World".

2001–present: Solo career
Following Aqua's split in 2001, Dif released solo singles, including "Let it all out (Push it)" and "The Uhh Uhh Song". In 2004 he began a career as an actor, starring in several movies directed by Lasse Spang Olsen. He owned a short-lived bar in downtown Copenhagen. In 2002 he published an autobiography titled Popdreng – Ud af skabet.

2007–present: Aqua reunion
Aqua reunited in 2008 as a live band. In March 2011, Aqua released the first single, "How R U Doin?", from their third album Megalomania, released in September 2011 following the release of two more singles, "Playmate to Jesus" and "Like a Robot".

Personal life
Dif was in a relationship with fellow Aqua band member Lene Nystrøm, whom he invited to join the band in 1994. They were in a relationship for three years, before they broke up.

He later married Rikke Maija, a health coach whom he has two children with.  They have since divorced.

He is now in a relationship with Linet Jo.

Discography

with Aqua

Studio albums

Compilations
 1994: Frække Frida og de frygtløse spioner

Singles

Guest appearances

Promotional singles
 1999: "I bif med Dif"
 2006: "Way to go" (MySpace release only)
 2011: "Sitting in a room" (Digital release only)

Music videos

Filmography

Motion pictures
 1999: Get ready to be boyzvoiced (Cameo)
 2004: Den gode strømer (The good cop) (Thomas)
 2004: Inkasso (The collector) (Omar Halim)
 2007: Pistoleros (Eurotrash) (Luc)
 2009: Sorte Kugler (Black eggs) (Cameo)
 2011: Far til fire – På japansk (Father of four – In Japanese mode) (TV Producer)
 2011: Det grå guld (The grey gold) (Neighbour #1)

Television
 2000: Reimer Bo møder (1 Episode)
 2001: Venner for livet – Friends forever (1 Episode)
 2001: Eurovision Song Contest 2001 (1 Episode)
 2002: Danish Dance Awards 2002 (1 Episode)
 2002: Go' aften Danmark (1 Episode)
 2003: Robbie Williams – Live in Horsens (1 Episode)
 2003: Stjerne for en aften – Portræt af en stjerne (1 Episode)
 2003: Rundfunk (1 Episode)
 2003: Go' aften Danmark (1 Episode)
 2004: Boogie Århus Listen (1 Episode)
 2004: Shooting Stars (1 Episode)
 2004: Sara & Signe (1 Episode)
 2005: aHA! (1 Episode)
 2005: Kanal 5's Bet on Bet Pokershow (1 Episode)
 2005: Clement direkte med Clement Kjersgaard (1 Episode)
 2006: Musikprogrammet – Dance 90'ernes danske eksportsucces (1 Episode)
 2006: Go' aften Danmark (1 Episode)
 2007: Gu'skelov du kom (1 Episode)
 2008: Zulu djævleræs (2 Episodes)
 2009: Den store klasse fest (1 Episode)
 2009: Zulu djævleræs (3 Episodes)
 2009: Vild med dans (6 Episodes)
 2014: South park (Cock Magic) (Performing Barbie Girl)

Commercials
 2006: Extra Bladet (Magazine)
 2007: Kim's Crisps – Chips Kongen (Food; 3 Commercials)
 2012: CBB Mobile (Mobile)

Books
 2002: Popdreng – Ud af skabet'' (Autobiography)

References

External links

Archived copy of René Dif's official website
 René Dif @ My Aquarium
 

1967 births
Living people
Aqua (band) members
Club DJs
Danish dance musicians
Danish DJs
Danish male singers
Danish people of Algerian descent
Danish pop musicians
Musicians from Copenhagen
Male actors from Copenhagen
English-language singers from Denmark
Electronic dance music DJs